The Czech Republic women's national under-20 volleyball team represents Czech Republic in international women's volleyball competitions and friendly matches under the age 20 and it is ruled by the Czech Volleyball Federation That is an affiliate of International Volleyball Federation FIVB and also a part of European Volleyball Confederation CEV.

Results

FIVB U20 World Championship
 Champions   Runners up   Third place   Fourth place

Europe U19 Championship
 Champions   Runners up   Third place   Fourth place

Team

Current squad

The following is the Czechs roster in the 2015 FIVB Volleyball Women's U20 World Championship.

Head Coach: Ales Novak

References

External links
 www.cvf.cz Official Website 

 

Volleyball
National women's under-20 volleyball teams
Women's volleyball in the Czech Republic